José Manuel Rojas Olmedo (born 10 April 1987) is a Spanish footballer who plays for UD San Sebastián de los Reyes mainly as a central defender.

Club career
Born in Seville, Andalusia, Rojas was a youth product at Atlético Madrid, making his senior debuts with the reserves in 2006 and going on to appear with several Tercera División and Segunda División B clubs during his early years. In the 2009 summer he joined Real Murcia, but appeared only with the B-team.

Rojas continued to appear in the third level in the following seasons, representing Real Jaén, CD San Roque de Lepe, La Roda CF and Albacete Balompié. With the latter he achieved promotion to Segunda División, appearing in 37 matches and scoring four goals.

On 24 August 2014, aged 27, Rojas played his first match as a professional, starting in a 2–3 home loss against AD Alcorcón. On 9 January, after appearing sparingly, he rescinded his link, and signed for SD Huesca hours later.

References

External links

1987 births
Living people
Spanish footballers
Footballers from Seville
Association football defenders
Segunda División players
Segunda División B players
Tercera División players
Atlético Madrid B players
CD Puertollano footballers
Real Jaén footballers
CD San Roque de Lepe footballers
Albacete Balompié players
SD Huesca footballers
Hércules CF players
CF Villanovense players
UD San Sebastián de los Reyes players
La Roda CF players